Maraq Kan (also Romanized as Maraq Kān) is a village in Nur Ali Beyk Rural District, in the Central District of Saveh County, Markazi Province, Iran. At the 2006 census, its population was 171, in 60 families.

References 

Populated places in Saveh County